The International Organization for Standardization (ISO) created and maintains the ISO 3166 standard – Codes for the representation of names of countries and their subdivisions.  The ISO 3166 standard contains three parts:
 ISO 3166-1 – Codes for the representation of names of countries and their subdivisions – Part 1: Country codes defines codes for the names of countries, dependent territories, and special areas of geographical interest. It defines three sets of country codes:
 ISO 3166-1 alpha-2 – two-letter country codes which are also used to create the ISO 3166-2 country subdivision codes and the Internet country code top-level domains.
 ISO 3166-1 alpha-3 – three-letter country codes which may allow a better visual association between the codes and the country names than the 3166-1 alpha-2 codes.
 ISO 3166-1 numeric – three-digit country codes which are identical to those developed and maintained by the United Nations Statistics Division, with the advantage of script (writing system) independence, and hence useful for people or systems using non-Latin scripts.
 ISO 3166-2 – Codes for the representation of names of countries and their subdivisions – Part 2: Country subdivision code defines codes for the names of the principal subdivisions (e.g., provinces, states, departments, regions) of all countries coded in ISO 3166-1.
 ISO 3166-3 – Codes for the representation of names of countries and their subdivisions – Part 3: Code for formerly used names of countries defines codes for country names which have been deleted from ISO 3166-1 since its first publication in 1974.

The ISO 3166-1 standard currently comprises 249 countries,  of which are sovereign states that are members of the United Nations. Many dependent territories in the ISO 3166-1 standard are also listed as a subdivision of their administering state in the ISO 3166-2 standard.

Current ISO 3166 country codes
The sortable table below contains the three sets of ISO 3166-1 country codes for each of its 249 countries, links to the ISO 3166-2 country subdivision codes, and the Internet country code top-level domains (ccTLD) which are based on the ISO 3166-1 alpha-2 standard with the few exceptions noted.  See the ISO 3166-3 standard for former country codes.

See also

International Organization for Standardization
ISO 3166
ISO 3166-1
ISO 3166-2
ISO 3166-3
Country code
 Comparison of alphabetic country codes
 List of IOC country codes
 List of FIFA country codes
 International vehicle registration code
 List of aircraft registration prefixes
 List of GS1 country codes
 List of country calling codes (International telephone dialing codes)
Lists of countries and territories
Sovereign state
List of sovereign states
List of states with limited recognition
Dependent territory
Timeline of historical geopolitical changes
United Nations
Member states of the United Nations
United Nations list of non-self-governing territories
Country code top-level domain
List of Internet top-level domains

Notes

References

External links

The International Organization for Standardization (ISO)
ISO 3166 Country Codes
The ISO 3166 Maintenance Agency

ISO 3166
03166
ISO 3166 country codes
ISO 3166 country codes